Calypogeia rhynchophylla is a species of liverwort in the family Calypogeiaceae. It is endemic to Costa Rica.  Its natural habitat is subtropical or tropical moist lowland forests.

References

Calypogeiaceae
Flora of Costa Rica
Vulnerable plants
Taxonomy articles created by Polbot